Stoner Lake is a  lake that is located in Alger County, Michigan with a small portion in Delta county in the Hiawatha National Forest.  Other nearby lakes include Lake Stella, Round Lake, West Branch Lake, Hugaboom Lake, Blue Lake, Ironjaw Lake, Ostrander Lake, Corner-Straits Chain and Toms Lake.

See also
List of lakes in Michigan

References 

Lakes of Alger County, Michigan
Lakes of Delta County, Michigan
Lakes of Michigan